Pleasant View is a census-designated place (CDP) in Armstrong County, Pennsylvania, United States. The population was 780 at the 2010 census.  Pleasant View was formerly part of the census-designated place of North Vandergrift-Pleasant View at the 2000 Census, before splitting into two separate CDPs for the 2010 census.

Demographics

References

External links

Census-designated places in Armstrong County, Pennsylvania
Census-designated places in Pennsylvania